William Morris Meredith Jr. (January 9, 1919 – May 30, 2007)  was an American poet and educator. He was Poet Laureate Consultant in Poetry to the Library of Congress from 1978 to 1980.

Biography

Early years
Meredith was born in New York City to William Morris Meredith Sr. and Nelley Keyser. He attended Lenox School in Massachusetts, graduating in 1936. He began writing while a college student at Princeton University. He graduated magna cum laude from Princeton in 1940, having written a senior thesis on Robert Frost. His first volume of poetry, Love Letter from an Impossible Land, appeared in 1944. Archibald MacLeish selected it for publication as part of the Yale Series of Younger Poets Competition.

Career
Meredith worked briefly for the New York Times as a copy boy and reporter before joining the United States Army Air Force in 1941. The next year, he transferred to the United States Navy as a carrier pilot. He served in the Aleutian Islands and Pacific Theater and reached the rank of lieutenant. He continued his service in the United States Navy Reserve until 1952, when he reenlisted to serve in the Korean War. He ultimately attained the rank of lieutenant commander and was awarded two Air Medals.

From 1946 to 1950, Meredith had several teaching appointments at Princeton University: Instructor in English, Woodrow Wilson Fellow in Writing, and Resident Fellow in Creative Writing. This was followed by an appointment as associate professor at the University of Hawaii (1950–51). After the Korean War he was hired as an associate professor of English at Connecticut College, where he taught until 1983. Meredith was promoted to professor in 1965. He settled on a farm in Uncasville, where he continued to write poetry and developed his talents as an arborist, planting and nurturing rare trees on the banks of the Thames. During this period, he also taught for several years in the summer graduate program at Middlebury College's Bread Loaf School of English. He was also an instructor at the Bread Loaf Writers' Conference from 1964 to 1971.

From 1964 to 1987, Meredith served as Chancellor of the Academy of American Poets. From 1978 to 1980, he was Consultant in Poetry to the Library of Congress, the position which in 1985 became the Poet Laureate Consultant in Poetry to the Library of Congress. He has the distinction of being the first gay poet to receive this honor.

In 1983, Meredith suffered a stroke and was immobilized for two years. The stroke caused expressive aphasia, which affected his ability to produce language. Meredith ended his teaching career and could not write poetry during this period. He regained many of his language skills after intensive therapy and traveling to Britain for treatment.

In 1988, Meredith was awarded the Pulitzer Prize for Poetry and a Los Angeles Times Book Award for Partial Accounts: New and Selected Poems. In 1997, he won the National Book Award for Poetry for Effort at Speech. Meredith also received a Guggenheim Foundation fellowship, the Harriet Monroe Memorial Prize, the Carl Sandburg Award, and the International Vaptsarov Prize in Poetry.

One of the most complete collections of Meredith's work, "The William Meredith Papers," is housed at Connecticut College, where he taught. The collection documents his life and work as of one of Connecticut College's most eminent faculty members and one of the nation's most respected poets. The collection contains letters, drafts, speeches, and papers relating to many organizations with which Meredith was associated, such as the Library of Congress, the Academy of American Poets, the American Academy of Arts and Letters, Connecticut College, Princeton University, Yaddo, the National Institute of Arts and Letters, the Bread Loaf Writers' Conference, cultural and governmental agencies in Bulgaria, and the Estate of W. H. Auden.

Connecticut College acquired the papers in 1994. They are in the Special Collections department of the Charles E. Shain Library. One may consult the collection by arrangement with the Special Collections Librarian. The library also has a virtually complete collection of Meredith's published work, including many of the anthologies and issues of literary journals in which individual poems were published or reprinted. The book collection also includes presentation copies of Robert Frost's poetry that Frost gave Meredith, several with inscriptions and holograph poems.

A longtime admirer of W. B. Yeats, Meredith fulfilled his ambition to visit Yeats's spiritual homeplace of Sligo, Ireland, in 2006. While there he also attended the Yeats International Summer School, which attracts many academics and admirers of Yeats to Sligo every summer.

Personal life
Meredith died in New London, Connecticut, near his home in Montville, where he lived with his partner of 36 years, the poet and fiction writer Richard Harteis. A film about his life, Marathon, premiered on November 19, 2008, in Mystic, Connecticut.

Bibliography

Poetry
 Love Letter from an Impossible Land (Yale University Press, 1944)
 Ships and Other Figures (Princeton University Press, 1948)
 The Open Sea and Other Poems (Alfred A. Knopf, 1957)
 The Wreck of the Thresher and Other Poems (Knopf, 1964) —finalist for the National Book Award
 Winter Verse (privately printed, 1964)
 Earth Walk: New and Selected Poems (Knopf, 1970)
 Hazard the Painter (Knopf, 1975) 
 The Cheer (Knopf, 1980)
 Partial Accounts: New and Selected Poems (Knopf, 1987)  —winner of the Pulitzer Prize
  —winner of the National Book Award

Essays
 Reasons for Poetry, and The Reason for Criticism (1982)
 Poems Are Hard to Read, University of Michigan Press, 1991,

Translation and Anthology
 Guillaume Apollinaire, Alcools: Poems, 1898-1913, Translator (Doubleday, 1964)
 Poets of Bulgaria, Editor (Unicorn Press, 1985)

Awards
 1988 Pulitzer Prize for Poetry – Partial Accounts
 1997 National Book Award for Poetry – Effort at Speech
 1975 Guggenheim Fellowship

References

External links

Archives 

 William Meredith papers at Washington University in St. Louis
 William Meredith and Robert Drew papers at Princeton University Library Special Collections

Other links 
William Meredith Foundation
 marathon the movie
 William Meredith profile and selected works at Academy of American Poets
 William Meredith page , Connecticut College Library, Department of Special Collections

 William Meredith at Library of Congress Authorities — with 71 catalog records
 Poetry Foundation biography page

1919 births
2007 deaths
20th-century American poets
American Poets Laureate
American people of Welsh descent
American LGBT poets
LGBT people from New York (state)
Members of the American Academy of Arts and Letters
National Book Award winners
Princeton University alumni
Pulitzer Prize for Poetry winners
Recipients of the Air Medal
Yale Younger Poets winners
Princeton University faculty
Connecticut College faculty
University of Hawaiʻi faculty
American male poets
United States Army Air Forces personnel of World War II
United States Naval Aviators
United States Navy pilots of World War II
United States Navy personnel of the Korean War
American Korean War pilots
20th-century American naval officers
Middlebury College faculty
20th-century American translators
20th-century American male writers
20th-century American LGBT people